The blotched shinning-skink (Cryptoblepharus megastictus) is a species of lizard in the family Scincidae. It is endemic to the Northern Territory and Western Australia.

References

Cryptoblepharus
Skinks of Australia
Endemic fauna of Australia
Reptiles described in 1976
Taxa named by Glen Milton Storr